Peter Meister (12 June 1954 – 11 July 2014) was an Austrian footballer. He played in one match for the Austria national football team in 1977.

References

External links
 

1954 births
2014 deaths
Austrian footballers
Austria international footballers
Place of birth missing
Association footballers not categorized by position